Muriel Janet Gray FRSE (born 30 August 1958) is a Scottish author, broadcaster and journalist. She came to public notice as an interviewer on Channel 4's alternative pop-show The Tube, and then appeared as a regular presenter on BBC radio. Gray has written for Time Out, the Sunday Herald and The Guardian, among other publications, as well as publishing successful horror novels. She was the first woman to have been Rector of the University of Edinburgh and is the first female chair of the board of governors at Glasgow School of Art.

Personal life
Born in East Kilbride, Gray is of partly Jewish ancestry. She presented a documentary for Channel 4 tracing her Jewish roots on her mother's side, entitled The Wondering Jew (1996), in which she discovered her maternal line descended from what is now Moldova. She is married to television producer Hamish Barbour and they have three children.

In 1997, their daughter nearly drowned in a garden pond, which left her permanently brain damaged.

On 31 January 2016, Gray was seen thanking the British Airways pilot of the plane in which her husband, Hamish Barbour, was a passenger, for successfully landing on three wheels instead of the usual five.

Career

Early career
A graduate of the Glasgow School of Art, she worked as a professional illustrator and then as assistant head of design in the National Museum of Antiquities in Edinburgh.

Broadcasting career
After playing in punk band The Family Von Trapp, she became an interviewer on the early Channel 4 alternative pop show The Tube from 1982; she was the main anchor on the short-lived ITV Border show Bliss in 1985, she presented Frocks on the Box (1987–88) and The Media Show (1987–89) again for Channel 4. She was briefly a DJ for Edinburgh's Radio Forth in 1983 and 1984. She was a regular stand-in presenter on BBC Radio 1 during most of the eighties, including for John Peel. She also presented regularly on BBC Radio 4, for Start the Week in Russell Harty's absence and also during Jeremy Paxman's leave.

Later she presented The Munro Show (which documented her climbing Scotland's highest hills, the Munros). She accompanied this with the book The First Fifty – Munro Bagging Without A Beard. She presented various other TV shows including Ride On, a motoring magazine show for Channel 4, The Design Awards, for BBC, and The Booker Prize awards for Channel 4.

Gray presented Art Is Dead – Long Live TV. This programme sparked a controversy when it was discovered that the series, covering the work of five artists, was a spoof.

Gray presented the definitive documentary on The Glasgow Boys, a group of influential 19th-century painters, including Sir John Lavery and James Guthrie, who challenged the orthodox values of their day. The Glasgow Boys was shown on BBC2.

Gray co-presented Channel 4's coverage of the 2016 Turner Prize ceremony in Glasgow.

Writing
Gray has been a columnist for many publications, including Time Out magazine, the Sunday Correspondent, the Sunday Mirror, Bliss magazine, and now writes a regular column in the Sunday Herald. She won Columnist of the Year in the 2001 Scottish press awards. She writes regularly for The Guardian.

She became a best selling horror novelist with the publication of her first novel The Trickster (1995), which was followed by two more, Furnace and The Ancient. Stephen King described The Ancient as "Scary and unputdownable." In 2004 a collection of short stories, "Scottish Girls About Town: And sixteen other Scottish women authors" was published. Gray was chosen with Jenny Colgan and Isla Dewar to feature on the cover.

She wrote a history of Glasgow's Kelvingrove Art Gallery and Museum to mark its re-opening in 2006. She appears on the BBC Two programme Grumpy Old Women.

In 2014 she contributed a new piece of writing for the 21 Revolutions project which had been inspired by the collection held in the Glasgow Women's Library.

Business interests
She started her own production company in 1989, originally named Gallus Besom (besom being a Scots Language term of contempt for a surly or purposely awkward woman by a process of synecdoche and gallus bold or cheeky in Scots), then renamed to Ideal World in 1993. It merged in 2004 with Wark Clements, the company co-owned by Kirsty Wark and her husband Alan Clements, to form IWC Media. The partners then sold the new company in 2005 to media company RDF Media for an estimated £12 million.

Honours and appointments
 She is a former Rector of the University of Edinburgh, the first woman ever to have held this post, and in 2006 was given an honorary degree of Doctor of Letters from the University of Abertay Dundee.

 In 2013 she was given an honorary degree, Doctor of Letters, from Glasgow School of Art and the University of Glasgow.

 In her guise as a mountaineer she appeared in the comic strip The Broons.

 She was the chair of the judges for the 2007 Orange Prize for Fiction.

 She was a judge of the Robert Burns Humanitarian Award.

 Gray was the vice chair of the committee choosing the architect for a new building to be constructed on a site facing Charles Rennie Mackintosh's Glasgow School of Art.

 Glasgow School of Art appointed her as their first female chair of the board of governors from December 2013.

 Appointed to the board of trustees of The British Museum in December 2015

 Awarded honorary fellowship of The Royal Incorporation of Architects in Scotland in July 2016
 Elected a Fellow of the Royal Society of Edinburgh in March 2018

 Appointed to the Board of the BBC as a non-executive director from the 3rd January 2022 until the 2nd January 2026.

Charity work

In 2005, she became Patron of the Scottish charity Trees for Life which is working to restore the Caledonian Forest. She is also a patron of the Craighalbert Centre, a conductive education school in Cumbernauld near Glasgow.  She currently serves as a trustee on the following boards: the British Museum, Glasgow Science Centre, the Scottish Maritime Museum, The Lighthouse and the Children's Parliament. She supports Action Earth. In January 2009 she became the first patron of Scotland's Additional Support Needs Mediation Forum, RESOLVE:ASL.

Writing

Fiction
 The Trickster (1994), shortlisted for the 1995 British Fantasy Society Best Novel prize.
 Furnace (1996)
 The Ancient (2000)

Non fiction
 The First Fifty: Munro-bagging Without a Beard (1991) 
 These Times, This Place (2005) 
 Kelvingrove Art Gallery and Museum: Glasgow's Portal to the World. (2006)

References

External links
 Gazetteer for Scotland biography
 Bibliography
 
 

1958 births
Living people
20th-century Scottish novelists
20th-century Scottish women writers
21st-century Scottish women writers
Alumni of the Glasgow School of Art
People educated at the High School of Glasgow
People from East Kilbride
Rectors of the University of Edinburgh
Scottish columnists
Scottish horror writers
Scottish Jewish writers
Scottish Jews
British people of Moldovan-Jewish descent
Scottish journalists
Scottish non-fiction writers
Scottish television presenters
Scottish women novelists
Scottish women columnists
Women horror writers
BBC Board members